Pulchellodromus simoni is a spider species found in Portugal, Spain and Algeria.

The species was first described in 1875 by Eugène Simon as Philodromus pernix. However, this name had already been used, so in 1929, Mello-Leitão gave it the replacement name Philodromus simoni. It was later moved to the genus Pulchellodromus.

References

External links 

Philodromidae
Spiders of Europe
Spiders of Africa
Fauna of Algeria
Spiders described in 1875